Bhaji in Problem is a 2013 Indian Punjabi-language comedy film directed by Smeep Kang, who had earlier directed films like Carry on Jatta and Lucky Di Unlucky Story, both of which featured Gippy Grewal in the lead role. Grewal also appears in this film, with an ensemble cast including Ragini Khanna, Gurpreet Ghuggi, B. N. Sharma, Karamjit Anmol, Japji Khaira, Khushboo Grewal and Misha Bajwa, amongst others. The film is produced by Ashvini Yardi.Bollywood actor Akshay Kumar, who also appears in the film briefly as a lookalike of himself. The film also features actor Om Puri and cricketer Harbhajan Singh. Bhaji in Problem was released on 15 November 2013 on over 600 screens worldwide.

Synopsis
The movie centres around Sundeep Cheema (Gurpreet Ghuggi), a man married to two women. Both of his wives, Anu (Misha Bajwa) and Jasmeet (Khushboo Grewal), are unaware of the existence of the other and believe that Cheema has business-related reasons that he has to be away from them half of the time. While Sundeep is leading a happy life, the balance of his duality is threatened when Jeeta (Gippy Grewal) comes into his life. Jeeta falls head over heels for Preet (Ragini Khanna), a match that Sundeep is firmly against. Sundeep is aware of Jeeta's notorious past, and Jeeta is privy to Sundeep's dual existence, leading to a comedy of errors in which both sides know the deepest and the most intimate secrets of the other. This leads to a battle of wits and charm wherein two friends encounter further problems.

Cast
 Gippy Grewal as Jeeta
 Ragini Khanna as Preet
 Gurpreet Ghuggi as Cheema
 B.N. Sharma
 Karamjit Anmol as Maninder
 Khushboo Grewal as Jasmeet
 Misha Bajwa as Anu
 Harbhajan Singh as Harbhajan (Special appearance)
 Akshay Kumar (Special appearance)

Soundtrack

Awards and nominates

References 

2013 films
Viacom18 Studios films
Punjabi-language Indian films
2010s Punjabi-language films
Films scored by Jatinder Shah